"Bad Morning" is a song by American rapper YoungBoy Never Broke Again, released on September 24, 2021, as the opening track from his third studio album, Sincerely, Kentrell . Released while incarcerated, the song portrays an image of pain and suffering while also including a sense of gangsta rap as he speaks about firearms and illegal activity.

Background
The song was first teased by YoungBoy via his Instagram as a Triller snippet prior to his incarceration. Garnering major attention while incarcerated, YoungBoy's team added it to Sincerely, Kentrell.

In the songs, YoungBoy makes notable references to DaBaby's chart-topping 2019 studio album Kirk as he rapped: "Ridin' bumpin' Kirk with a .30 and a pole." He also made references to his devotion to Islam as he rapped: "All praise to Allah, one was dead in less than sixty." YoungBoy also made direct reference to Herm Tha BlackSheep, YoungBoy's close friend and Never Broke Again-signee.

Critical reception
Rolling Stones Will Dukes noted that "over somber pianos and a soulful organ[s]," YoungBoy "reflects on some of his regrets." HotNewHipHops Will Aron A. stated that "gospel organs and shredding guitars fuel the production for NBA Youngboy to offer a dose of honest reflection and bossed up flexes. It’s a song that captures Youngboy’s trials and tribulations, as well as his perseverance throughout the ups and downs."

Charts

Certifications

References

2021 songs
YoungBoy Never Broke Again songs
Songs written by YoungBoy Never Broke Again